The year 1669 in science and technology involved some significant events.

Astronomy
 February 23 –  Isaac Newton writes his first description of his new invention, the reflecting telescope. 
 Geminiano Montanari detects the variability of the eclipsing binary Algol.
 Jean Picard begins measurement of 1 degree of Earth's meridian arc in France.

Biology
 Marcello Malpighi publishes Dissertatio Epistolica de Bombyce in London, a study of Bombyx mori which is the first published monograph on an invertebrate.
 Robert Morison publishes Praeludia Botanica, emphasising use of the structure of a plant's fruits for its classification.
 Francis Willughby and John Ray publish "Experiments concerning the motion of sap in trees, made this spring".
 Jan Swammerdam publishes Historia Insectorum Generalis in the Netherlands, explaining the process of metamorphosis in insects.

Chemistry
 Phosphorus is discovered by German alchemist Hennig Brand, the first chemical element to be discovered that was not known since ancient times.

Geology
 Nicolas Steno puts forward his theory that sedimentary strata had been deposited in former seas, and that fossils are organic in origin.

Mathematics
 October 29 – Isaac Newton is appointed Lucasian Professor of Mathematics at the University of Cambridge.

Physics
 Rasmus Bartholin publishes his observation of the birefringence of a light ray by Iceland spar (calcite).
 Robert Boyle publishes A Continuation of New Experiments Physico-mechanical, Touching the Spring and Weight of the Air, and Their Effects.

Physiology and medicine
 Richard Lower publishes his Tractatus de Corde on the workings of the heart.
 The Chinese traditional herbal medicine company Tong Ren Tang (同仁堂) is established in Beijing by imperial physician Yue Xianyang.

Publications
 Isaac Barrow publishes Lectiones Opticæ et Geometricæ in London.

Births
 May 26 – Sébastien Vaillant, French botanist (died 1722)

Deaths
 April 12 – Abdias Treu, German mathematician (born 1597)
 c. April – Nicasius le Febure, French-born royal chemist, alchemist and apothecary (born 1615)

References

 
17th century in science
1660s in science